This is a list of seasons completed by the Toronto Blue Jays, based in Toronto, Ontario, and a member of Major League Baseball's (MLB) American League East Division. Since June 5, 1989, the Blue Jays have played in the Rogers Centre (called the "SkyDome" until February 2, 2005). Before that, they played at Exhibition Stadium. They played their 2020 season at Sahlen Field in Buffalo, New York due to the COVID-19 pandemic. The name "Blue Jays" was chosen via a contest in 1976 from among more than 4,000 suggestions.

The Blue Jays made their MLB debut during the 1977 baseball season, as an expansion team. They first made the playoffs in 1985, by capturing the American League East Division, but lost the American League Championship Series (ALCS) in seven games to the Kansas City Royals. The team returned to the playoffs in 1989, where they lost to the Oakland Athletics in the ALCS in five games, and again in 1991, where once more the Blue Jays were defeated in the ALCS in five games, this time by the Minnesota Twins.

In 1992, the Blue Jays became the first Canadian-based team to win the Commissioner's Trophy, with a pair of six-game victories over Oakland in the ALCS and the Atlanta Braves in the World Series. In 1993, they repeated their success, with another pair of six-game victories over the Chicago White Sox in the ALCS and the Philadelphia Phillies in the World Series. After 1993, the Blue Jays failed to qualify for the playoffs for 21 consecutive seasons, until clinching a playoff berth in 2015.

Through 46 seasons of baseball, the Blue Jays have recorded 26 seasons at .500 or better, 25 of which have been winning campaigns, and have qualified for the playoffs nine times while winning two league pennants.

Table Key

Year by year results

Note: The statistics are current as of the 2022 Major League Baseball season.

Record by decade 
The following table describes the Blue Jays' MLB win–loss record by decade.

These statistics are from Baseball-Reference.com's Toronto Blue Jays History & Encyclopedia, and are current as of October 3, 2021.

Post-season record by year
The Blue Jays have made the postseason nine times in their history, with their first being in 1985 and the most recent being in 2022.

Notes
 Voting for the 1979 American League Rookie of the Year Award ended in a tie. Griffin shared the award with John Castino of the Minnesota Twins.
 The 1981 season was shortened by a players' strike. MLB decided to split the season into two halves, with the division winner of each half playing in a divisional round of the playoffs.
 The 1994–95 Major League Baseball strike  ended the season on August 11, as well as cancelling the entire postseason.
 The 1994–95 Major League Baseball strike  caused the shortening of the 1995 season to 144 games.
  Start of season delayed due to the global COVID-19 pandemic (60 games)

References

External links
 
 
 

 
Major League Baseball teams seasons
Seasons